The Calpet Rockshelter, also known as the Overlook Rockshelter and Archeological Site 48SU354 is an archeological site in Sublette County, Wyoming.  The site includes an overhanging rock outcrop at the base of a butte that was used by Native Americans and European-Americans.  The Native American use includes occupation by the Shoshone. A number of surface artifacts have been found and at least two buried cultural levels have been investigated from the Fremont and late Prehistoric-period Shoshone. Fremont, Prehistoric, Protohistoric and Historic-period visitation is documented at nine petroglyph panels.

The site was placed on the National Register of Historic Places in 1994.

References

External links
 Calpet Rockshelter at the Wyoming State Historic Preservation Office

Archaeological sites on the National Register of Historic Places in Wyoming
Geography of Sublette County, Wyoming
Rock shelters in the United States
National Register of Historic Places in Sublette County, Wyoming